Capivari is a municipality in the state of São Paulo in Brazil. The population is 56,379 (2020 est.) in an area of 323 km².

People
Tarsila do Amaral (1886–1973), painter, born in the area of Fazenda São Bernardo, currently located in the municipality of Rafard.
Leo Vaz, writer
Bruno Uvini, footballer

References